Bedenica is a village and a municipality in Zagreb County, Croatia. It is located near the town of Sveti Ivan Zelina.

The municipality has 1,432 inhabitants, absolute majority of which are Croats. There are a total of six settlements ("naselja") in the municipality:

 Bedenica - 555
 Beloslavec - 263
 Bosna - 97
 Omamno - 151
 Otrčkovec - 32
 Turkovčina - 334

References

External links 
 

Municipalities of Croatia
Populated places in Zagreb County